This is a list of the 67 episodes for The Guardian, an American drama series which aired on CBS from September 25, 2001 to May 4, 2004. The series revolved around Nick Fallin, a corporate attorney sentenced to 1500 hours community service with Legal Services of Pittsburgh as the result of a drug conviction. The plot focused on Nick's community service and recovery from drug addiction, as well as his strained relationship with his father who was president of the corporate law firm where Nick was employed full-time.

Series overview

Episodes

Season 1 (2001–02)

Season 2 (2002–03)

Season 3 (2003–04)

Home video releases

References

External links 
 
 

Guardian, The